James David Washington (born August 26, 1980), known professionally as Jim BEANZ, is an American vocal producer, songwriter, actor, singer and record producer from Harrisburg, Pennsylvania. He is signed to Timbaland Productions and Sunset Entertainment Group.  He began his career when he was an artist in the R&B group "Tresan", during which time he received mentorship from Dru Hill. In 2005, Beanz started working alongside Timbaland as a vocal producer. He co-wrote the winning entry of the Eurovision Song Contest 2008, "Believe" by Dima Bilan. Jim Beanz also wrote and produced songs on the first season of the FOX series Empire, and portrayed the rapper "Titan".

Credits

2004

Hair Show Soundtrack
 Khaliya Williams "Wanna Get With You"

2005

El Feco
 "Like It Like That"

Apache Indian – Time For Change
 18. "A Prayer For Change" (featuring Gunjan)

Shakira – Oral Fixation Vol. 2
 05. "Animal City" – co-producer

Jamie Foxx – Unpredictable
 05. "Can I Take U Home" – background vocals

2006

Kulcha Don – It's All About You
 07 "Say So"

Nelly Furtado – Loose
 01. "Afraid" (featuring Attitude)
 02. "Maneater" – vocal producer, co-writer, background vocals
 03. "Promiscuous" (featuring Timbaland)– vocal producer, background vocals
 04. "Glow"
 05. "Showtime" – vocal producer, background vocals
 06. "No Hay Igual" – vocal producer, background vocals
 08. "Say It Right" – vocal producer, background vocals
 09. "Do It" – vocal producer
 11. "Wait For You" – vocal producer
 13. "All Good Things (Come to an End)" – vocal producer, background vocals
 Maneater (Jim Beanz Bhangra Remix) (featuring Amar) – producer
 Promiscuous (Jim Beanz Bhangra Remix) (featuring Amar & Timbaland) – producer, background vocals

Danity Kane – Danity Kane
 03. "Want It" – vocal producer, co-writer
 04. "Right Now" – vocal producer, co-writer

Fergie – The Dutchess
 unknown tracks with Timbaland

Diddy – Press Play
 14. "After Love" (featuring Keri Hilson) – co-writer

Gwen Stefani – The Sweet Escape
 "Fast Lane"
 unknown tracks with Timbaland

Fantasia – Fantasia
 12. "Bore Me (Yawn)" – co-writer

2007

Katharine McPhee – Katharine McPhee
 01. "Love Story" – vocal producer
 03. "Open Toes" – vocal producer
 05. "Not Ur Girl" – vocal producer
 06. "Each Other" – vocal producer
 07. "Dangerous" – vocal producer
 11. "Neglected" – vocal producer, background vocals

Timbaland – Timbaland Presents Shock Value
 03. "Release" (featuring Justin Timberlake) – background vocals
 06. "Come And Get Me" (featuring 50 Cent & Tony Yayo) – background vocals
 12. "Bombay" (featuring Amar & Jim Beanz)

Lady Ru – My Addiction
 01. "My Addiction" (featuring Amar)
 02. "Snake Charmer" (featuring El Feco)
 03. "Hands Up" (featuring Kuf Knotz & Azyah)
 04. "Got Me (Burnin' Up)" (featuring Apache Indian, Shahin Badir & Leseya Lee)
 05. "Catch Me" (featuring Taz)
 06. "Your Woman"
All Produced by Jim Beanz
 07. "Chances Are" (featuring Channi Singh) – additional vocal producer
 11. "Mr. DJ" (featuring Leseya Lee) – vocal producer, co-writer
 12. "You & Me" (featuring Kino) – co-writer
 "My Man" (featuring Anjali & Mana)
 "My Obsession" (featuring Gunjan)
 "So Hot" (featuring Ms. Jade & Apache Indian)
 "So Many Ways" (featuring Kufie The MC)

Mutya Buena Real Girl
 "Heat"
 "Wanna Be"

M.I.A. – K A L A
 12. "Come Around" (featuring Timbaland)

Britney Spears – Blackout
 01. "Gimme More" – vocal producer, co-writer, background vocals
 04. "Break The Ice" – vocal producer, co-writer, background vocals
 06. "Get Naked (I Got A Plan)" – vocal producer, co-writer
 09. "Hot As Ice" – vocal producer, background vocals
 11. "Perfect Lover" – vocal producer, co-writer, background vocals
 13. "Outta This World" – vocal producer, co-writer
 15. "Get Back" – vocal producer, background vocals

Duran Duran – Red Carpet Massacre
 03. "Nite Runner" – additional vocals
 05. "Box Full O' Honey" – vocal producer
 09. "Zoom In" – vocal producer
 10. "She's Too Much" – vocal producer, background vocals
 11. "Dirty Great Monster" – vocal producer
 12. "Last Man Standing" – vocal producer

Test Drive
 "Drive Me Crazy" (featuring Sebastian) – vocal producer, co-writer

2008

Keri Hilson
 "Get It Girl" – background vocals

Danity Kane – Welcome to the Dollhouse
 02. "Bad Girl" (featuring Missy Elliott) – vocal producer, co-writer, background vocals
 03. "Damaged" – vocal producer
 05. "Strip Tease" – vocal producer, co-writer
 12. "Poetry" – vocal producer

Credits on the first run of this album are wrong, Jim Beanz was the vocal producer on 90% of Danity Kane album. As seen in Making the Band 4, Season 2.

Matt Pokora – MP3
 01. "Dangerous" (featuring Sebastian & Timbaland) – vocal producer, co-writer
 02. "Catch Me If You Can" – vocal producer, co-writer
 04. "No Me Without U" – vocal producer, co-writer
 12. "Why Do You Cry?" – co-producer, vocal producer, co-writer
 14. "Like A Criminal" – vocal producer, co-writer

Day26 – Day26
 02. "Got Me Going"
 06. "Co Star"
 07. "Come In (My Door's Open)
 13. "Just Should've Told You"

Ashlee Simpson – Bittersweet World
 01. "Outta My Head (Ay Ya Ya)" – vocal producer, co-writer, background vocals
 02. "Boys" – co-writer
 03. "Rule Breaker" – vocal producer, co-writer, background vocals
 04. "No Time For Tears" – background vocals
 05. "Little Miss Obsessive" (featuring Tom Higgenson) – vocal producer, co-writer
 06. "Ragdoll" – vocal producer, co-writer, background vocals
 07. "Bittersweet World" – vocal producer, background vocals
 08. "What I've Become" – vocal producer, co-writer, background vocals
 09. "Hot Stuff" – co-writer
 10. "Murder" (featuring Izza Kizza) – vocal producer, co-writer, background vocals
 "Can't Get Over It"
 "Follow U"

Ashanti – The Declaration
 14. "Why" – co-writer
 "For My Man"
 "The World Song"

Taio Cruz – She's Like A Star Single
 "I Just Wanna Know (Jim Beanz Remix)"

Donnie Klang – Just a Rolling Stone
 06. "Pick It Up"

Jennifer Hudson – Jennifer Hudson
 03. "Pocketbook" (featuring Ludacris) – co-producer, co-writer, background vocals
 "Fallin Out Of Heaven"

Craig David – Greatest Hits
 04. "Insomnia" – producer

Lemar – The Reason
 03. "Little Miss Heartbreaker"

Britney Spears – Circus 
 01. "Womanizer" – vocal producer
 04. "Kill The Lights" – co-writer, background vocals
 08. "Blur" – vocal producer, background vocals

Jamie Foxx – Intuition 
 02. "I Don't Need It" – vocal producer, background vocals
 17. "Street Walker"
 "Nothin For Ya"

Jada
 unknown track

2009

Chris Cornell – Scream (Mosley/Interscope/Universal) 
 01. "Part of Me" – vocal producer, background vocals
 02. "Time" – co-writer, vocal producer, background vocals
 03. "Sweet Revenge" – co-writer with James Fauntleroy, vocal producer, background vocals
 04. "Get Up" – co-writer with James Fauntleroy, vocal producer, background vocals
 05. "Ground Zero" – co-writer, vocal producer, background vocals
 06. "Never Far Away" – co-writer with Ryan Tedder & The Clutch, vocal producer, background vocals
 07. "Take Me Alive" – co-written with Justin Timberlake, vocal producer, background vocals 
 08. "Long Gone" – vocal producer
 09. "Scream" – co-writer, vocal producer, background vocals 
 10. "Enemy" – co-writer with Ryan Tedder & The Clutch, vocal producer, background vocals
 11. "Other Side Of Town" – co-writer, vocal producer
 12. "Climbing Up The Walls" – co-writer, vocal producer
 13. "Watch Out" – co-writer, vocal producer, background vocals
 "Lost Cause"

Keri Hilson – In A Perfect World... (Zone 4-Mosley Interscope/Universal) 
 04. "Return the Favor" (featuring Timbaland) – vocal producer
 06. "Slow Dance" – co-writer with Justin Timberlake, vocal producer, background vocals
 08. "Intuition" – writer, co-producer, vocal producer
 09. "How Does It Feel" – co-writer, co-producer, vocal producer, background vocals
 14. "Where Did He Go" – vocal producer
 15. "Quicksand" – vocal producer
 16. "Hurts Me" – vocal producer
 "The Ring"

Dzham
 "Every Day"

Ciara – Fantasy Ride (Jive/RCA Records/LaFace, Sony Music, Zomba) 
 04. "Turntables" (featuring Chris Brown) – vocal producer, background vocals
 08. "Work" (featuring Missy Elliott) – vocal producer

Charlie Hustle
 "Go Hard" (featuring Rebel)

Dima Bilan – Believe
 01. "Automatic Lady" – producer, vocal producer, writer
 02. "Don't Leave" — producer, vocal producer, background vocals, writer
 03. "Amnesia" — producer, co-writer with Ryan Tedder
 04. "Number 1 Fan" — producer, vocal producer, writer
 05. "Believe" — producer, vocal producer, background vocals, writer
 06. "Lonely" – producer, vocal producer, writer
 07. "Mistakes" – producer, vocal producer, background vocals, writer
 09. "Anythin' 4 Love" (featuring D.O.E.) – producer, vocal producer, writer
 11. "Circles" — producer, vocal producer, background vocals
 "Number 1 Fan" (featuring Sebastian) — producer, vocal producer, background vocals, writer

Esmée Denters – Outta Here (Tennman/Interscope/Universal) 
 04. "Love Dealer" – background vocals
 05. "Gravity" – vocal producer, background vocals
 10. "The First Thing" – vocal producer, background vocals
 13. "Sad Symphony" – co-writer, vocal producer
 "Boyfriend"
 "Closer"

Luigi Masi – Save His Shoes
 03. "Strobelight" – producer, vocal producer, writer
 06. Better Now (featuring Sebastian) – producer, vocal producer, writer

Ginuwine – A Man's Thoughts
 "Disappearing Acts (featuring James Fauntleroy)
 "Hate To Love"

Lemar
 "U Got Me"

Whitney Houston – I Look To You
 "Undefeated" – producer, co-writer with Candice Nelson

Shakira – She Wolf
 13. "Give It Up to Me" (featuring Lil Wayne)

Adam Lambert – For Your Entertainment
 11. "Sleepwalker" – vocal production

Leseya Lee – The Phoenix
 01. "Get Up And Jump"
 02. "Junk N Tha Trunk"
 03. "Blow" (featuring Cavan)

Timbaland – Shock Value II
 02. "Carry Out" (featuring Justin Timberlake) – writer, additional vocals
 06. "Tomorrow in the Bottle" (featuring Chad Kroeger & Sebastian) – writer
 07. "We Belong to the Music" (featuring Miley Cyrus) – writer, vocal producer
 08. "Morning After Dark" (featuring Nelly Furtado & SoShy)- writer, additional vocals, vocal producer
 09. "If We Ever Meet Again" (featuring Katy Perry) – writer, co-producer with Timbaland, vocal producer
 10. "Can You Feel It" (featuring Esthero & Sebastian) – writer
 11. "Ease Off the Liquor" – writer
 12. "Undertow" (featuring The Fray & Esthero) – writer
 13. "Timothy Where You Been" (featuring Jet) – writer
 14. "Long Way Down" (featuring Daughtry) – writer
 15. "Marchin On (Timbo Version)" (featuring OneRepublic) – writer
 17. "Symphony" (featuring Attitude, Bran' Nu & D.O.E.) – writer
 "I'm in Love With You" (featuring Tyson Ritter) – writer

JC Chasez – Kate
 "Fire" – co-producer

Samantha Jade
 "Eyez On Me"  – co-producer with Timbaland
 "Make U Love Me" – co-producer with Timbaland and King Logan of The Royal Court
 "Curious" – co-writer with Samantha Jade & Corte Ellis

2010

Amar – Show It Off
 01. "Masala" (featuring Jim Beanz & D.O.E.)
 02. "Sajana (Pyar Ka Pehra) (featuring Shankar Mahadevan)
 03. "See Me Girl" (featuring Apache Indian)
 04. "Bombay Billionaire" (featuring Sonu Niigaam)
 09. "Dil Ruba"
 14. "Dekhne Tumko Tarse Naina"

Gunjan – Goonj: Echoes From Gunjan
 01. "Tum Mile"

Lemar
 "Shout Out"

Rebel
 "Get in Fit In"
 "Have You Made Love Lately"
 "Is This What They Call Love"
 "Reloaded"
 "Roses"
 "Shoulda Coulda"
 "Snows in July"
 "Strung Out"
 "Who Are You"
 "Wifey"
 "Disappearing Acts"

JoJo – Can't Take That Away from Me
 03. "Pretty Please"

Tina
 "So Good" (featuring Fat Joe)

Rihanna – Loud
 unknown tracks with Timbaland

Chase Landon
  "Flirt" – producer, vocal producer, co-writer with Candice Nelson

Keyshia Cole – Calling All Hearts
 09. "Last Hangover" (featuring Timbaland) – vocal producer

Craig David - "Signed Sealed Delivered"
  "Dirty Mouth" – producer, vocal producer, co-writer

2011

Raghav – The Phoenix
  "Fire" – producer, vocal producer, co-writer
  "Top of the World" – producer

Chris Brown – F.A.M.E.
 16. "Paper, Scissors, Rock" (featuring Timbaland & Big Sean)

Dima Bilan – Dreamer
 "Rocket Man" – producer, vocal producer, writer
 "Get Outta My Way" – producer, vocal producer, writer

Luigi Masi – Pick Up Line
 "Pick Up Line" – producer, vocal producer, writer

Demi Lovato- Unbroken
 01. "All Night Long" (featuring Missy Elliott & Timbaland) – writer, vocal producer
 04. "Together" (featuring Jason Derulo) – writer, co-produced with Timbaland, vocal producer
 05. "Lightweight" – writer, co-produced with Timbaland, vocal producer

Patricia Kazadi
 "Go Crazy (Jim Beanz Remix)"

Joe Jonas – Fastlife
 09. "Not Right Now" – writer

Real Steel Soundtrack
 09. Timbaland feat. Veronica "Give It A Go"

Day26 – A New Day
 "Made Love Lately"

2012

Cheryl Cole – A Million Lights
 "Screw You" (featuring Wretch 32) – vocal producer
 "Sexy Den a Mutha" – co-writer, producer
 "All Is Fair" – co-writer, producer
 "Boys Lie" – co-writer, producer, background vocals
 "I Like It" – co-writer, producer, additional vocals
 "Teddy Bear" – co-writer, producer

JoJo – Jumping Trains
 "Hell of a Song"
 "I Want Him On Top (Of My Life)"
 "Sexy to Me"

Lyrica Anderson – King Me Mixtape
 "Mixtape"
 "Mixtape" feat. Missy Elliott

2013

Darin – Exit
 "Playing With Fire"
 "Before I Pass Out (feat. Lil Jon)"
 "Same Old Song"
 "F Your Love"
 " What It's Like"

AGNEZ MO
 "Coke Bottle feat Timbaland and T.I"

2015
 Titan TV series Empire

Lil' Kim
 unknown tracks with Timbaland

Deborah Cox
 "Baby Love"
 "Call It Love"
 "Can't Wait"
 "Famous"
 "Love Will Conquer All"
 "No Good"
 "Picky Girl"
 "Unexpected Hero"

Lemar
 "Our Song"
 "Turn It Off"
 "War No More"

References

External links
 
 
 "The Thomas Crown Chronicles" Jim Beanz News Archive
 "Mosley Music Group" Jim Beanz News Archive
 Jim Beanz Management, Vandana Gupta and Mike Daddy

Musicians from Harrisburg, Pennsylvania
Record producers from Pennsylvania
Songwriters from Pennsylvania
Musicians from Philadelphia
Eurovision Song Contest winners
Living people
1980 births